Justo Cándido López Fregueda (1906 – death unknown) was a Cuban outfielder in the Negro leagues in the 1920s and 1930s. 

A native of Havana, Cuba, López made his Negro leagues debut in 1926 with the Cuban Stars (West). He played five seasons with the club, then went on to play for the Cuban Stars (East) and New York Cubans. López was selected to play in the East–West All-Star Game in 1939, his final season.

References

External links
 and Baseball-Reference Black Baseball stats and Seamheads

1906 births
Date of birth missing
Year of death missing
Place of death missing
Cuban Stars (East) players
Cuban Stars (West) players
New York Cubans players
Baseball outfielders
Baseball players from Havana